The action of 1 February 1625 was a naval engagement between a Portuguese fleet and an allied Anglo-Dutch fleet, that took place on 1 to 24 February 1625 in the Persian Gulf. Although an allied tactical victory, with the Anglo-Dutch force inflicting several times their losses on the Portuguese, it resulted in a strategic Portuguese victory as they were able to regain the control of the Persian gulf.

Ships involved

Allies
 England:
 Eagle – 1 killed
 Royal James – 13 killed
 Jonas – 11 killed
 Star – 4 killed
 Netherlands:
 South Holland
 Bantam
 Maud of Dort
 Weasope

Portugal

 São Francisco 48 (Don Aliud Batellia) – 38 killed
 São Francisco 32 (Francisco Burge) – 31 killed
 São Sebastião 40 (António Teles de Meneses) – 20 killed
 São Salvador 22 – 41 killed
 Santiago 22 – 83 killed,
 Trindade 24 (Alva Botelia) – 24 killed
 Santo António 22 – 22 killed, sank later
 Misericórdia 22 (Samuel Rodriguez Chava) – 3 killed
 galleys

References

1625 in Asia
Naval battles involving England
Naval battles of the Dutch–Portuguese War
Naval battles involving Portugal
Naval battles involving the Dutch Republic
Conflicts in 1625
History of the Persian Gulf
England–Portugal relations
Portugal–United Kingdom military relations